Matt Barron (born 17 November 1986) is a former Wales international rugby league footballer who played in the 2000s and 2010s. He announced his retirement from rugby league on 7 February 2018.

Early and personal life
Born in Durham, England, Barron is of Welsh descent from his Rhondda-born mother. He played his community rugby league for the Gateshead Panthers. He was previously in a relationship with England goalkeeper Carly Telford.

Club career
On 20 Sep 2021 it was reported that Matt had come out of retirement to play for Toronto Wolfpack, in their first fixture since their Super League exit, versus Washington DC Cavalry in the inaugural Canada Cup competition. He was named as captain.

International career
Barron was named in the Wales squad to face England at the Keepmoat Stadium prior to England's departure for the 2008 World Cup. He played for Wales in the 2009 European Cup, 2014 European Cup and 2015 European Cup tournaments.

On 10 October 2017, Barron was named in Wales' 24-man squad for the 2017 World Cup.

References

External links
(archived by web.archive.org) Newcastle Thunder Profile
(archived by web.archive.org) Statistics at rlwc2017.com

1986 births
Living people
English expatriate rugby league players
English rugby league players
English people of Welsh descent
Newcastle Thunder players
Rugby league players from County Durham
Rugby league props
Rugby league second-rows
Toronto Wolfpack captains
Toronto Wolfpack players
Wales national rugby league team players